Jakub Szyszkowski (born 21 August 1991) is a Polish athlete specialising in the shot put. He won the gold medal at the 2013 European U23 Championships. In addition, he represented his country at the 2013 World Championships without qualifying for the final.

His personal bests in the event are 20.92 metres outdoors (Wrocław 2017) and 20.55 metres indoors (Toruń 2015).

Competition record

References

1991 births
Living people
Polish male shot putters
Place of birth missing (living people)
Śląsk Wrocław athletes